Bekaa Kafra is a Lebanese village located in the Bsharri District in Northern Lebanon. Bekaa Kafra is located in front of the village of Bsharri across the Kadisha Valley. It is the birth town of Saint Charbel. Bekaa Kafra has an altitude ranging from 1500 m to 2000 m at its highest point, making it the highest village in Lebanon and one of the highest in the Middle East.

Etymology 
The name Bekaa Kafra comes from the Syriac language and means "mountain crack village"

Climate 

Bekaa Kafra has a temperate climate with warm, dry summers and cold, snowy winters. It is cold in winter for two reasons: Its location in Northern Lebanon, and its high altitude. Temperatures in winter average around 0 °C and can reach -10 °C to -30 °C. Temperatures in summer average around 18 °C, but they may reach 20 °C to 25 °C in July and August, but can also drop to as low as 6 °C at night. Snow in winter can accumulate up to 6 meters and occasionally more.

Position 

Bekaa Kafra is among the claimants to the status of highest village in Lebanon. Most of its settled is situated approximately 1700 meters above sea level.

External links
Bqaa Kafra, Localiban

Bsharri District
Maronite Christian communities in Lebanon